The Russian Artistic Gymnastics Championships is an annual Russian national artistic gymnastics competition. It is organized by the Ministry of Sport and the Russian Artistic Gymnastics Federation and financed from the federal budget. Since 2008 the championships have always been held in the town of Penza.

Medalists

Women

Team competition

All-around

Vault

Uneven Bars

Balance beam

Floor

Men

All-around

References

External links 
 Official website of the Russian Artistic Gymnastics Federation 

 

 
Artistic Gymnastics
Gymnastics competitions in Russia
Russia